Olearia passerinoides, commonly known as slender daisy bush, is a species of flowering plant in the family Asteraceae and is endemic to southern continental Australia. It is a slender, sticky shrub with linear leaves, and white or pale mauve and mauve or pink daisy flowers.

Description

Taxonomy
This daisy bush was first formally described in 1851 by Nikolai Turczaninow, who gave it the name Diplopappus passerinoides in Bulletin de la Société Impériale des Naturalistes de Moscou, based on plant material collected by James Drummond. In 1867, George Bentham changed the name to Olearia passerinoides in Flora Australiensis. The specific epithet (passerinoides) means "Passerina-like".

In 1985, David Cooke described two subspecies of O. passerinoides in the Journal of the Adelaide Botanic Gardens and the names are accepted by the Australian Plant Census:
 Olearia passerinoides subsp. glutescens (Sond.)
 Olearia passerinoides (Turcz.) Benth. subsp. passerinoides (Sond.)

Distribution and habitat
Olearia passerinoides grows in mallee, forest and shrubland in southern continental Australia. Only subsp. passerinoides is listed as occurring in Western Australia. Both subspecies are listed as occurring in New South Wales, Victoria and South Australia. In Victoria, subsp. glutinosa is only known from near Inglewood but subspecies passerinoides is more widely distributed but rare, in the north-west of that state.

References

passerinoides
Flora of Western Australia
Flora of South Australia
Flora of New South Wales
Flora of Victoria (Australia)
Plants described in 1851
Taxa named by Nikolai Turczaninow